The Christening is a 2010 Polish drama film directed by Marcin Wrona.

Cast 
 Wojciech Zieliński as Michal Leba
 Tomasz Schuchardt as Janek
 Natalia Rybicka as Magda
 Adam Woronowicz as Gruby
 Michał Koterski as Lysy
  as Dres
  as Wyzelowany
Aleksandra Radwańska as Agata
Natalia Rybicka as Magda
Anita Poddębniak as Leśniakowa
 Drew Roden as himself

References

External links 

2010 drama films
2010 films
Febiofest award winners
Polish drama films
2010s Polish-language films